The 1979 Irish local elections were held in all the counties, cities and towns of Ireland on Thursday, 7 June 1979, on the same day as the first direct elections to the European Parliament.

Results

Total seats

County councils 

 Two of the three non-party Monaghan councillors were nominated by the Protestant Association.

Source:

Large corporations 

Five of the six non-party members of Dublin Corporation were elected as Community candidates, including Tony Gregory, Seán Dublin Bay Loftus and Carmencita Hederman.

Small corporations

References

Sources

Citations

See also 
Local government in the Republic of Ireland
:Category:Irish local government councils

 
1979 elections in the Republic of Ireland
Local elections
1979
June 1979 events in Europe